Spilarctia contaminata is a moth in the family Erebidae. It was described by Alfred Ernest Wileman in 1910. It is found in Taiwan.

References

Moths described in 1910
contaminata